Cognitive engineering is a method of study using cognitive psychology and cognitive neuroscience to design and develop engineering systems to support or improve the cognitive processes of users.

History
It was an engineering method used in the 1970s at Bell Labs, focused on how people form a cognitive model of a system based upon common metaphors. As explained, by Joseph Henry Condon:

According to Condon, the ideas of cognitive engineering were developed later than, and independent from, the early work on the Unix operating system.

Don Norman cited principles of cognitive engineering in his 1981 article, "The truth about Unix: The user interface is horrid." Norman criticized the user interface of Unix as being "a disaster for the casual user." However the "casual user" is not the target audience for UNIX and as the Condon quote above indicates, a high level of user interface abstraction leads to cognitive models that may be "totally erroneous."

See also
 History of Unix
 Outline of human–computer interaction

References

Bell Labs
Human–computer interaction